KMRY (1450 AM, "Classic KMRY") is a radio station licensed to serve Cedar Rapids, Iowa, owned by Sellers Broadcasting, Inc.
 
The station was assigned the KMRY call letters by the Federal Communications Commission on November 21, 1988.

Awards
In September 2002, the station (as KLWW, its 1960s incarnation) was inducted into the Iowa Rock & Roll Hall of Fame.

In November 2002, station owner and long-time morning host Rick Sellers was honored with the Cedar Rapids Freedom Festival Peter Teahen Award.

Programming
The station broadcasts 24 hours a day, 7 days a week. The bulk of its music programming, the "Greatest Hits of All Time," consists of Top 40 hits from the mid-1960s to the mid-1980s.

The station employs four LIVE on-air personalities; morning show host (Eric Walker), mid-mornings host (Ricky Bartlett), news director (Cary J. Hahn) and afternoon drive host (Susan Gordon).

Music broadcasts at other hours, including the noon – 3pm weekdays, are automated.

Additionally, the station is the home for Xavier High School athletic.

The station carries CBS Radio news at the top of every hour.

On Sunday mornings, the station airs Sunday Morning Church Services from First Lutheran Church In Cedar Rapids (8:30 – 9:00am) Followed be a block of Polka music (9:05am – noon).

HD radio
In 2004, KMRY became the first AM radio station in Iowa to implement HD Radio broadcasting. On January 4, 2004, the first consumer sale of a commercial HD radio, a Kenwood model KTC-HR 100 converter, was made at Ultimate Electronics in Cedar Rapids as a publicity stunt before the national debut at the Consumer Electronics Show in Las Vegas later that week. As of September 2012, the station was no longer broadcasting in HD.

FM Radio
On July 1, 2011 KMRY began simulcasting its AM programming on FM, broadcasting a 250 watt signal on 93.1 MHz from translator K226BO in Cedar Rapids, Iowa (originally located in Anamosa, Iowa).

On-Air Personalities
Ricky Bartlett Morning Show Host |
Monday-Friday 6am-11am
(http://kmryradio.com/ricky-bartlett/)

Holly 'Stevie' Penuel Mid-Morning Host | Monday-Friday 11am-3pm
(https://kmryradio.com/holly-penuel)

Chris Jensen Afternoon Drive Host | Monday-Friday 3pm-6pm
(https://kmryradio.com/chris-jensen)

Jim Ecker - Owner/Sports (https://kmryradio.com/jim-ecker)

Ken Fields Saturday Mornings
(https://kmryradio.com/ken-fields-1)

Frank Balvanz Jukebox Rewind LIVE | Saturday 7pm-9pm
(https://kmryradio.com/frank-balvanz)

Dave Franklin Sunday Morning Polka Host
(https://kmryradio.com/frank-balvanz)

Scot Hughes Play-by-Play
(https://kmryradio.com/scot-hughes)

References

External links
FCC History Cards for KMRY
KMRY official website

MRY
Classic hits radio stations in the United States
Radio stations established in 1948
1948 establishments in Iowa